In mathematics, particularly linear algebra, an orthogonal basis for an inner product space  is a basis for  whose vectors are mutually orthogonal.  If the vectors of an orthogonal basis are normalized, the resulting basis is an orthonormal basis.

As coordinates
Any orthogonal basis can be used to define a system of orthogonal coordinates  Orthogonal (not necessarily orthonormal) bases are important due to their appearance from curvilinear orthogonal coordinates in Euclidean spaces, as well as in Riemannian and pseudo-Riemannian manifolds.

In functional analysis
In functional analysis, an orthogonal basis is any basis obtained from an orthonormal basis (or Hilbert basis) using multiplication by nonzero scalars.

Extensions

Symmetric bilinear form
The concept of an orthogonal basis is applicable to a vector space  (over any field) equipped with a symmetric bilinear form  where orthogonality of two vectors  and  means  For an orthogonal basis 

Hence for an orthogonal basis  

Quadratic form
The concept of orthogonality may be extended to a vector space (over any field) equipped with a quadratic form .

See also

References

External links

 

Functional analysis
Linear algebra
de:Orthogonalbasis